The Gentle Sex is a 1943 British black-and-white romantic comedy-drama war film, directed and narrated by Leslie Howard. It was produced by Concanen Productions, Two Cities Films, and Derrick de Marney. The Gentle Sex was Howard's last film before his death.

Synopsis
The documentary-drama follows seven women from different backgrounds who meet at an Auxiliary Territorial Service training camp. "Gentle" British girls, they are now doing their bit to help out in World War II: driving lorries and manning ack-ack batteries. Leslie Howard provides slightly sarcastic narration throughout the film.

The girls are allowed to socialise at organised dances with local male troops. Music is contemporary (big band swing) and dancing includes the jitterbug. Several of the girls find romance. The narrator points out that "war is never kind to lovers".

Cast
Best source is at BFI:

ATS volunteers
 Joan Gates as Gwen Hayden
 Jean Gillie as Dot Hopkins
 Joan Greenwood as Betty Miller
 Joyce Howard as Anne Lawrence
 Rosamund John as Maggie Fraser
 Lilli Palmer as Erna Debruski
 Barbara Waring as Joan Simpson

Other characters
 John Justin as Flying Officer David Sheridan
 Mary Jerrold as Mrs Sheridan
 John Laurie as Corporal Alexander Balfour
 Elliott Mason as Mrs Fraser
 Harry Welchman as Captain Ferrier
 Miles Malleson as train guard
 Jimmy Hanley as first soldier on train
 Meriel Forbes as Davis, junior commander
 Rosalyn Boulter as Sally, telephonist
 Tony Bazell as Ted
 Frederick Leister as Colonel Lawrence
 Everley Gregg as Miss Simpson
 Noreen Craven as convoy sergeant
 Frederick Peisley as second soldier on train
 Ronald Shiner (as Ronnie Shiner) as the racing punter in the pub
 Roland Pertwee as captain
 Nicholas Stuart (actor) as Canadian private
 Frank Atkinson (actor) as lorry driver
 Peter Cotes as Taffy
 Maud Dunham as Mrs Miller
 Leslie Howard as narrator ("observations of a mere man")
 and various appearances by members of HM Forces

Box office
Kinematograph Weekly listed a series of films that were "runners up" in its survey of the most popular films in Britain in 1943: The Gentle Sex, The Lamp Still Burns, Dear Octopus and The Adventures of Tartu.

Critical reception
TV Guide noted "some lucid and funny moments in a capable and intelligent production for its time"; and Billy Mowbray wrote, for Film 4, "if only social history was this good at school. Funny, fascinating and probably unlike any film you've seen before, The Gentle Sex is a bona fide cultural treasure."

References

Further reading
 Lejeune, C. A. (1947) Chestnuts in her Lap. London: "Mädchen in Uniform: The Gentle Sex", pp. 95–96

External links
 
 
 
 

1943 films
1940s romantic comedy-drama films
1940s war comedy-drama films
British black-and-white films
British romantic comedy-drama films
Films directed by Leslie Howard
Films produced by Leslie Howard
Two Cities Films films
British World War II propaganda films
British war comedy-drama films
1943 war films
1940s English-language films